The One Tree is a fantasy novel by American  writer Stephen R. Donaldson, the second book of the second trilogy of The Chronicles of Thomas Covenant series. It is followed by White Gold Wielder.  This book differs from the others in the First and Second Chronicles, in that the story takes place outside of the Land, although still in the same world.

Plot summary
Following the vision he received from the Clave at Revelstone, Thomas Covenant seeks to fix the corruption of the Land after the Staff of Law's destruction. He is accompanied on his quest by Linden Avery, a physician from his own "real" world, and four Haruchai bodyguards. They use a ship crewed by the Giants, a benevolent, seafaring people. The journey is made more difficult by Covenant's bouts of madness from the venomous bite of a Sunbane-spawned monster. Linden, who in this world is endowed with clairvoyance, is frustrated by her inability to help him.

From the Land, the Giant-ship sails to the home of the Elohim, a wise race. Linden perceives that the Elohim are the embodiment of Earthpower, the source of the beauty and magic. Despite their seeming omnipotence, the Elohim are bound by a strange code of behavior and provide no direct help, other than helping Covenant unlock the location of the One Tree, from which the Staff of Law was fashioned. In the course of rendering this service, the Elohim cause Covenant to go into a catatonic state; "don't touch me" is all he can say.

The travelers find that one of the Elohim, named Findail, has joined them aboard the Giants' ship for his own purposes. The questors are not pleased but are powerless to make him leave. After suffering severe damage in a storm, in which Findail refuses to help, the ship arrives at the port city of the Bhrathair, a militaristic – but also wealthy and civilized – people living at the edge of a great desert. The Bhrathair are ruled by the gaddhi, Rant Absolain, who rather coldly receives the quest's shore party, and it is discovered that the true ruler is the gaddhis chief adviser, a wizard named Kasreyn of the Gyre. Kasreyn initially appears to be kindly disposed to the quest but is revealed to have ulterior motives.

The ship is repaired, but the ill will between the travelers and the gaddhi breaks out into overt violence. Two of the Haruchai guards lose their lives. The feud was the result of a manipulative ploy by Kasreyn. The wizard abducts Covenant, who is still in a catatonic state, and attempts to use his powers to compel Covenant to give up his ring. The remainder of the shore party is imprisoned in the dungeon. Linden reluctantly uses her power to invade Covenant's consciousness, breaks his catatonia, and thwarts Kasreyn's efforts to seize the ring. Covenant and the Haruchai fight their way to Kasreyn's laboratory but discover that Kasreyn has a parasitic being living on his back that provides him with extended longevity and immunity to physical attack. Findail kills both the parasite and Kasreyn, setting off a palace coup that leaves the port in a state of chaos.

After narrowly escaping, the ship arrives at the One Tree's island location. Brinn, Covenant's Haruchai bodyguard, sacrifices himself in a duel with the Tree's Guardian ak-Haru Kenaustin Ardenol. He is regenerated as the new Guardian and leads the party to the Tree itself. Cable Seadreamer, the mute giant, stops Covenant from taking a piece of the Tree. When Seadreamer makes the attempt himself, he is killed: he has disturbed the Worm of the World's End, which sleeps beneath the Tree and whose "aura" serves as a defense mechanism. This aura triggers Covenant's power to an exponential degree. As Covenant attempts to overwhelm the Worm with his power, Findail warns Linden that the Arch of Time cannot contain the struggle between the two powers and that the world will be destroyed if it continues.

Linden, much against her will, mentally reaches out to Covenant. Sharing his thoughts, she sees him open a passage back to the "real" world and attempts to return her to it. She senses, however, that in the "real" world Covenant's body is very weak and will die if he does not himself return. Unwilling to do this, Covenant draws Linden back through the rift between the worlds. With her help, he is able to contain his power, but at the price of the Isle of the One Tree sinking beneath the ocean as the earth heaves with the movements of the Worm of the World's End settling back from disturbance into slumber. Thus, the quest ends in failure.

External links 
Glossary of terms from the Second Chronicles of Thomas Covenant

1982 American novels
1982 fantasy novels
The Chronicles of Thomas Covenant books
Novels by Stephen R. Donaldson
Del Rey books